The Indeogwon–Dongtan Line (also known as Indeogwon–Suwon Line) is a double track subway line planned to open in May 2026.

Stations
The following list of stations may be subject to change as the line is constructed and various sources give conflicting information.

Literature

References

Railway lines in South Korea